Gita Mahotsav, Gita Jayanti, also known as Mokshada Ekadashi or Matsya Dwadashi marks the day the Bhagavad Gita dialogue occured between Arjuna and Krishna on the battlefield of Kurukshetra. It is celebrated on Shukla Ekadashi, the 11th day of the waxing moon of the lunar month Margashirsha (December-January) of the Hindu calendar. The Bhagavad Gita forms a part of the epic Mahabharata and the text is structurally divided into 18 chapters, containing 700 shlokas or couplets. It is told in the third person, narrated by Sanjaya to King Dhritarashtra as it transpired between Krishna and Arjuna. Sanjaya, the scribe of the blind King Dhritarashtra, was blessed by his guru, Ved Vyasa, with the power to remotely view the events taking place on the battlefield as they transpired.

Gita story

In the epic Mahabharata, the story of the Bhagavad Gita takes place just before the start of the Kurukshetra War. After several attempts at reconciliation failed, war was inevitable. Out of pure compassion and sincere love for his devotee and best friend, Arjuna, Lord Krishna decided to become his charioteer during the battle. The day of the war finally came, and the armies faced off on the field of war. Just as the battle was about to start, Arjuna asked Lord Krishna to drive the chariot to the middle of the battlefield, between the armies, to look more closely at the opposing forces. Seeing his grandfather, Bhishma, who raised him with great affection since childhood, and his teacher, Dronācārya, who had trained him to become the greatest archer, Arjuna's heart began to melt. His body started to tremble and his mind got confused.  He became unable to perform his duty as a Kshatriya (warrior). He felt weak and sickened at the thought that he would have to kill his relatives, his friends and revered persons in this confrontation. Despondent, he told Krishna of his sudden change of heart and turned to him for advice. The conversation that ensued, Lord Krishna's advice, messages and teachings to Arjuna, is what is known now as the Bhagavad Gita, the ancient scripture and philosophical work. The Gita is said to be a concise summary of the four Vedas of Hinduism.

Gita Aarti

The Bhagavad Gita Aarti or Gita Aarti] is a prayer found in the Sreemad Bhagavad Gita shastra.

The aarti can be spoken, or sung with musical instruments to give more effect to worship. Aartis are usually performed at the end of the puja ritual. It is said that if there was any flaw in the puja, it may be fulfilled by the aarti.

Lyrics

Celebration

During the International Gita Mahotsav, more than 300 national and international stalls are set up around the Brahma Sarovar in Kurukshetra city. Pilgrims also undertake the 48 Kos Parikrama of Kurukshetra.

2016 
In 2016, the Government of Haryana organized the International Gita Mahotsav from 6 to 10 December. Pranab Mukherjee, President of India, was to inaugurate the Mahotsav; later it was done by Kaptan Singh Solanki, Governor of Haryana, and Manohar Lal Khattar, Chief Minister.

2017 
In 2017, the Gita Mahotsav was held on 25 November to 3 December, inaugurated by Ram Nath Kovind, President of India.

2019 

The International Gita Mahotsav 2019 was inaugurated by Haryana Chief Secretary Keshni Anand Arora on 23 November 2019 on the bank of the Brahma Sarovar water pool in Thanesar, Haryana..

2020 
The Government of Haryana celebrated the International Gita Mahotsav from 17 December to 25 December 2020.

2021 
Gita Jayanti 2021: Today on 14 December 2021, Gita Mahotsav was celebrated with great pomp. This celebration was being held in Kurukshetra from 2 December to 19 December 2021. International Gita Mahotsav is organized by Kurukshetra Development Board, Haryana Tourism, District Administration, North Zone Cultural Centre Patiala and Information and Public Relations Department Haryana.

Tradition
Reading Gita usually starts with Gita Dhyanam and the Gita Aarti sometime either found at the beginning or end of all the Gita chapters.

See also
 Hindu pilgrimage sites in India
 48 Kos Parikrama of Kurukshetra
 Braj Parikrama
 Culture of Haryana
 Ballabhgarh Kartik Cultural Festival
 Haryana State Farmer's and Agri-tourism Fair
 Pinjore Baishakhi and Mango fairs
 Surajkund International Crafts Mela

References

External links

 Gita Jayanti Singapore's official website, under the auspices of the Hindu Endowments Board

Mahabharata
Bhagavad Gita
Hindu festivals
Religious festivals in India
December observances